In 1843, George Sones built a sawmill and founded the unincorporated village of Sonestown within what is now Davidson Township, Sullivan County, in the U.S. state of Pennsylvania. All of these events occurred before Sullivan County was formed from part of Lycoming County on March 14, 1847. The bridge was built in 1850, and in the late 19th century Sonestown "boomed like crazy" as the lumber industry grew in Sullivan County. The village was then home to a plant that manufactured the staves for making barrels. It had a clothespin factory from 1903 to 1929 but lost almost all industry by the 1930s. As of 1996, Sonestown had a population of about 200, most of whom commuted to work in Muncy, Montoursville, and Williamsport. In 1996 the village had a few stores, an inn with a restaurant, and attracted tourists and hunters.

The Eagles Mere Railroad (1892-1928), a narrow-gauge line providing rail access to the resort town of Eagles Mere, had its southern terminus in Sonestown.

References 

1843 establishments in Pennsylvania
Populated places in Sullivan County, Pennsylvania